is a Japanese tarento and actress. She appeared in the Nippon TV series Koi no kara Sawagi as the ninth generation member from 2002 to 2003 and was nicknamed . In 2004 she started other careers other than a tarento. She appeared in television advertisements and music videos. Her film debut was Nise-satsu in April 2009.

Nishikata is represented with Yoshimoto Creative Agency. It was discovered that in 2009 she is dating Nise-satsu director Yuichi Kimura. After three years they were later married in May 2012.

Filmography

TV series
Variety

Drama

Advertisements

Music videos

Films

Others

Stage

Books

References

External links
 

Japanese television personalities
Japanese actresses
1980 births
Living people
People from Aichi Prefecture
Actors from Aichi Prefecture